Akheem Gauntlett (born 26 August 1990) is a Jamaican sprinter. He competed in the 4x400 meters relay event at the 2013 World Championships in Athletics, winning a silver medal.

Personal bests

References

External links 
 

1990 births
Living people
Jamaican male sprinters
Sportspeople from Kingston, Jamaica
Athletes (track and field) at the 2014 Commonwealth Games
World Athletics Indoor Championships medalists
Commonwealth Games competitors for Jamaica